The Minsk Ghetto was created soon after the German invasion of the Soviet Union. It was one of the largest in Belorussian SSR, and the largest in the German-occupied territory of the Soviet Union. It housed close to 100,000 Jews, most of whom were murdered in The Holocaust.

History
The Soviet census of 1926 showed 53,700 Jews living in Minsk (constituting close to 41% of the city's inhabitants).

The ghetto was created on 28 June 1941, soon after the German invasion of the Soviet Union and capture of the city of Minsk, capital of the Belorussian SSR. On the fifth day after the occupation, 2,000 Jewish intelligentsia were massacred by the Germans; from then on, murders of Jews became a common occurrence. About 20,000 Jews were murdered within the first few months of the German occupation, mostly by the Einsatzgruppen squads.

On 17 July 1941, the German occupational authority, the Reichskommissariat Ostland, was created. On 20 July, the Minsk Ghetto was established. A Jewish Council (Judenrat) was established as well. The total population of the ghetto was about 80,000 (over 100,000 according to some sources), of whom about 50,000 were pre-war inhabitants, and the remainder (30,000 or more) were refugees and Jews forcibly resettled by the Germans from nearby settlements.

In November 1941 a second ghetto was established in Minsk for Jews deported from the West, known as Ghetto Hamburg, which adjoined the main Minsk ghetto. Above the entrance to this separate ghetto was a sign: Sonderghetto (Special Ghetto). Every night the Gestapo would murder 70–80 of the new arrivals. This ghetto was divided into five sections, according to the places from which the inhabitants came: Hamburg, Berlin, the Rhineland, Bremen, and Vienna. Most of the Jews in this ghetto were from Germany and the Protectorate of Bohemia and Moravia; the largest number it held at once was about 35,000 residents. Little contact was permitted between the inhabitants of the two ghettos.

As in many other ghettos, Jews were forced to work in factories or other German-run operations. Ghetto inhabitants lived in extremely poor conditions, with insufficient stocks of food and medical supplies.

On 2 March 1942, the ghetto's nursery or orphanage was "liquidated"; the children were buried alive in a pit after the murderers had tossed them candy: At that moment, several SS officers, among them Wilhelm Kube, arrived, whereupon Kube, immaculate in his uniform, threw handfuls of sweets to the shrieking children. All the children perished in the sand. In March 1942, approximately 5,000 Jews were killed nearby where "The Pit" memorial to the Minsk ghetto now stands. On 31 March, the Germans raided the ghetto to arrest Resistance leaders, and much of the ghetto, including the synagogue, was burned.

By August, fewer than 9,000 Jews were left in the ghetto, according to German official documents. The ghetto was liquidated on 21 October 1943, with many Minsk Jews perishing in the Sobibor extermination camp. Several thousands were massacred at Maly Trostenets extermination camp (before the war, Maly Trostenets was a village a few miles to the east of Minsk). By the time the Red Army retook the city on 3 July 1944, there were only a few Jewish survivors.

Resistance

The Minsk Ghetto is notable for its large scale resistance organization, which cooperated closely with Soviet partisans. About 10,000 Jews were able to escape the ghetto and join  partisan groups in the nearby forests. Barbara Epstein estimates that perhaps half of them survived, and notes that all together, perhaps as many as 30,000 people tried to escape the Minsk Ghetto to join the partisans (but 20,000 of them could have died along the way).

Notable inmates
Rokhl Brokhes (1882—1942?), writer
Paula Fürst (1894–1942?), educational reformer
Ida Jenbach (1868–1941?), journalist, playwright and screenwriter
Hanna Krasnapiorka (1925—2000), writer and journalist
Heinz Rosenberg (1921–1997), writer
Anatoly Rubin (1927–2017), writer, athlete, teacher
Cläre Tisch (1907–1942?), economist
Simcha Zorin (1902–1974), partisan

See also
 Maly Trostenets extermination camp
 The Holocaust in Belarus
 Jewish ghettos of Europe

References

Further reading
 Barbara Epstein, The Minsk Ghetto 1941–1943: Jewish Resistance and Soviet Internationalism, University of California Press, 2008, 
 Hersh Smolar, The Minsk Ghetto: Soviet-Jewish Partisans Against the Nazis, Holocaust Library, 1989,

External links
 Map of the Minsk Ghetto at USHMM
 
 Minsk Ghetto Photographs
 1943 Minsk Ghetto List
  Political Controversy Marks Anniversary Of Minsk Ghetto's Destruction, Radio Free Europe, October 22, 2008
 'Interviews from the Underground: The Minsk Ghetto Resistance'

Einsatzgruppen
Minsk Ghetto
Ghetto
Holocaust locations in Belarus
Jewish ghettos in Nazi-occupied Belarus
Jews and Judaism in Minsk